The British Rail Class 807 AT300 is a type of electric multiple unit being built by Hitachi Rail for train operator Avanti West Coast. Based on the Hitachi A-train design, a total of 10 seven-car units will be produced.

History
In December 2019, Avanti West Coast placed an order for 10 seven-car electric units which will replace its Class 221 fleet, along with 13 Class 805 bi-mode units as part of £350 million contract with Hitachi Rail.  All are scheduled to be in service by 2023.
The trains are financed by rolling stock company Rock Rail West Coast, a joint venture between Rock Rail and Standard Life Aberdeen.
The trains will be maintained by a joint team of Alstom and Hitachi staff, alongside the Class 805, at Oxley depot near Wolverhampton.

Customer service features promised include free Wi-Fi, at-seat wireless inductive charging for electronic devices, plug sockets and USB sockets; a catering offer and a real-time passenger information system that can advise of connecting rail services.

Construction 
Construction of the Class 807 in the UK commenced on 7 July 2020. The aluminium shells arrived  after being shipped from Hitachi's Kasado plant in Japan. Final production commenced at Hitachi's Newton Aycliffe facility. Out of the 135 bodyshells, 56 are being manufactured in the UK.

Static testing began in June 2022 and the trains are planned to enter service in 2023.

Fleet details

References

External links

High-speed trains of the United Kingdom
Hitachi multiple units
25 kV AC multiple units
Train-related introductions in 2023